Slovenský plynárenský priemysel, a.s. (abbr. SPP; Slovak: literally Slovak Gas Industry) is a state-owned energy supplier headquartered in Bratislava, Slovakia. The company follows on from over 150 years of gas industry in Slovakia. It is the biggest natural gas seller in Slovakia. In addition to natural gas, it sells CNG and LNG, and supplies electricity.

On 1 July 2006, the company completed the legal unbundling, while according to the requirements of Slovak and European legislation, the companies SPP – preprava, a.s., nowadays Eustream, active in the area of international gas transmission, and SPP – distribúcia, a.s. in the area of natural gas distribution commence their activities.

In 2014, the Government of Slovakia became a sole owner of the company.

In 2019, the company was selected by the state as a single buyers of renewable power in Slovakia for 2020–2021. Slovakia uses 5 billion cubic meters of natural gas per year. In 2022, SPP ordered 32% of its supplies as pipe gas from Norway, and 34% as shipborne LNG via several countries.

References

External links
 Company website (EN, SK)

Oil and gas companies of Slovakia
Companies established in 2006
Energetický a průmyslový holding